Oppertshausen is an Ortsgemeinde – a municipality belonging to a Verbandsgemeinde, a kind of collective municipality – in the Rhein-Hunsrück-Kreis (district) in Rhineland-Palatinate, Germany. It belongs to the Verbandsgemeinde Simmern-Rheinböllen, whose seat is in Simmern.

Geography

Location
The municipality, a rural residential community, lies in the central Hunsrück in a gently sloping location at the Simmerbach valley. To the east lies the town of Simmern. and to the west lies the Kauerbach valley.

History
Archaeological finds show that the area was settled in the New Stone Age, or in the time of the Hunsrück-Eifel Culture. In 1285, Oppertshausen had its first documentary mention. The village belonged to the Duchy of Palatinate-Simmern, which introduced the Reformation in 1556. Later, the Elector of the Palatinate was the landholder. Beginning in 1794, Oppertshausen lay under French rule. In 1814 it was assigned to the Kingdom of Prussia at the Congress of Vienna. Since 1946, it has been part of the then newly founded state of Rhineland-Palatinate.

Politics

Municipal council
The council is made up of 6 council members, who were elected by majority vote at the municipal election held on 7 June 2009, and the honorary mayor as chairman.

Mayor
Oppertshausen's mayor is Peter Konrad.

References

External links

Oppertshausen in the collective municipality’s webpages 
Brief portrait of Oppertshausen with film at SWR Fernsehen 

Municipalities in Rhineland-Palatinate
Rhein-Hunsrück-Kreis